Walter Hanisch Espindola (1916 - October 13, 2001) was a Chilean Jesuit and historian. He had a doctorate in theology from the Pontifical Catholic University of Chile.

20th-century Chilean historians
Historians of the Captaincy General of Chile
20th-century Chilean male writers
21st-century Chilean historians
21st-century Chilean male writers
20th-century Chilean Jesuits
21st-century Chilean Jesuits
Jesuit historians and chroniclers
1916 births
2001 deaths